Scott Kneller (born 1989)  in central Australia. He is an Australian freestyle skier. He represented Australia at the 2010 Winter Olympics in Vancouver. Competing in the ski cross, he came seventh. He came second in his 1/8 final, and then in his 1/4 final to qualify for the semifinals. In each race there are four competitors and the top two progress. He then came third in the semi-final and third in the Small Final, for those eliminated in the semifinals. He competed for Australia at the 2014 Winter Olympics in the  ski cross events.

Kneller completed high school at Hurlstone Agricultural High School in southern Sydney in 2007 and is currently studying a combined Bachelor of Commerce/Bachelor of Engineering at the University of New South Wales.

References

1989 births
Australian male freestyle skiers
Olympic freestyle skiers of Australia
Freestyle skiers at the 2010 Winter Olympics
Freestyle skiers at the 2014 Winter Olympics
Living people
People from Cooma
Sportsmen from New South Wales